The Men's road race at the 2014 Commonwealth Games, as part of the cycling programme, took place on 3 August 2014 over a distance of 168.2 km. The race was won by Geraint Thomas of Wales.

Results
140 riders were on the start list but only 12 reached the finish line :

References

Men's road race
Road cycling at the Commonwealth Games
2014 in men's road cycling